Ashok Sidharth is an Indian politician and a member of the upper house Rajya Sabha in India. Sidharth is a member of the Bahujan Samaj Party political party and was elected in the elections held in June 2016 Uttar Pradesh.He was appointed the In-Charge of Andhra Pradesh on 11-06-2018.

References

Living people
Bahujan Samaj Party politicians from Uttar Pradesh
Rajya Sabha members from Uttar Pradesh
Year of birth missing (living people)